The 2016–17 season is the 87th season in Girona FC ’s history and the 21st in the second-tier. They achieved promotion to La Liga for the first time in the club's history.

Squad

Competitions

Overall

Liga

League table

Matches

Kickoff times are in CET.

Copa del Rey

References

Girona FC seasons
Girona FC
Girona